Joan, Countess of Saint-Pol and Ligny (died 18 September 1430, Avignon), called the Demoiselle de Luxembourg, was the ruling Count of Saint Pol and Count of Ligny in 1430.

She was the daughter of Guy of Luxembourg, Count of Ligny and Mahaut of Châtillon, Countess of Saint-Pol. She did not marry, and had no children.

At the death of Philip I, Duke of Brabant, she was his nearest living relative on the Saint-Pol side and inherited Saint-Pol and Ligny upon his death on 14 August 1430. She was living at the time at Beaurevoir, which belonged to her favourite nephew John.

At this time, John held Joan of Arc, whom he had captured, as a prisoner. The Demoiselle de Luxembourg showed kindness to her and pleaded with her nephew not to sell Joan to the English, giving him a promise to make him her heir if he did not.

The Demoiselle died shortly thereafter; her fiefs were divided between her senior nephew, the Count of Brienne, who received Saint-Pol, and John, her favourite, who received Ligny.

Fiction
The Demoiselle is a character in Philippa Gregory's 2011 historical novel The Lady of the Rivers, which centres on her great-niece Jacquetta of Luxembourg.

References

Jeanne of Luxembourg at "Jeanne-darc.dk" 

Luxembourg, Jeanne of
Luxemburg, Jeanne of
Luxemburg, Jeanne of
St Pol, Countess of, Jeanne of Luxembourg
Year of birth unknown
15th-century French people
15th-century French women
15th-century women rulers
Joan of Arc